Longshore Sailing School is a public facility in Westport, Connecticut that teaches sailing and paddling.  It is "among the oldest and most renowned sailing programs in the country" and has earned "the country's most prestigious sail training awards".

Longshore was founded in 1960, by the Town of Westport Recreation Commission. In 1975. it changed to private operation . I’m 2017, Jane Pimentel became the owner/operator  

Longshore provides sailing courses for children from ages 8 through 16.  It also offers Adult programs in sailing.  The school's staff includes US Sailing Association certified instructors, Instructor Trainers and USCG licensed Masters.

Longshore rents sailboats, kayaks and stand-up paddleboards to the public.

References
Full Sail for the 45th Season

External links
Westport Location Homepage
Greenwich Location Homepage

Westport, Connecticut
Greenwich, Connecticut
Tourist attractions in Fairfield County, Connecticut
Sports venues in Fairfield County, Connecticut